The 1995 St. Petersburg Open was a men's tennis tournament played on indoor carpet courts in St. Petersburg, Russia at the Petersburg Sports and Concert Complex. It was the inaugural edition of the St. Petersburg Open, and was part of the World Series of the 1995 ATP Tour. The tournament was held from 13 March until 20 March 1995. It was the first time that three Russian players reached the semifinals of an ATP tournament. Yevgeny Kafelnikov won the singles title.

Finals

Singles

 Yevgeny Kafelnikov defeated  Guillaume Raoux, 6–2, 6–2 
It was Kafelnikov's 2nd title of the year and 5th of his career.

Doubles

 Martin Damm /  Anders Järryd defeated  Jakob Hlasek /  Yevgeny Kafelnikov, 6–4, 6–2
 It was Damm's 2nd title of the year and 71st title overall. It was Järryd's 2nd title of the year and 59th title overall.

References

External links
 Official website
 ATP tournament profile
 ITF tournament edition details

St. Petersburg Open
St. Petersburg Open
St. Petersburg Open
St. Petersburg Open